Lior Bakshi (born 13 July 1989 in Israel) is an Israeli footballer who currently plays for Hapoel Ramat Gan. He previously played for Hapoel Jerusalem on loan from Hapoel Tel Aviv. Bakshi was included in the Hapoel Tel Aviv UEFA cup team for the 08/09 season.

References

External links
 

1989 births
Living people
Israeli footballers
Association football fullbacks
Hapoel Tel Aviv F.C. players
Hapoel Jerusalem F.C. players
Hapoel Ramat Gan F.C. players
Maccabi Kiryat Malakhi F.C. players
Israeli Premier League players
Liga Leumit players